St Joseph’s Catholic High School (colloquially known as St Joseph's') is a co-educational Roman Catholic secondary school located in Workington, Cumbria, England.

History  
The school has stood on the same site since it opened in 1929, however the building has received a number of alterations, such as the addition of various extra blocks, an AstroTurf, a new library, a canteen extension, a separate building for English lessons, and a move around and adaptation of most of the classrooms throughout the school. It has also acquired a specialism in Business and Enterprise, and more recently, embarked on a Leading Edge programme in Drama.

Previously a voluntary aided school administered by Cumbria County Council, in September 2021 St Joseph's Catholic High School converted to academy status. It is now sponsored by the Mater Christi Multi Academy Trust, and continues to be under the jurisdiction of the Roman Catholic Diocese of Lancaster.

Buildings 
The school has many separate buildings. The four-storey block houses many classrooms, namely for Science, History and Geography lessons as well as having offices for members of staff. There is also a main hall, a sports centre with a fitness gym and sports hall, a Business and Enterprise Centre with a conference room, two large ICT suites. The art department contains two large classrooms and a small section for computers, the Design Technology department has three classrooms, one for resistant materials, one for graphic design and one for catering. The English department is located at Banklands and contains 5 classrooms, toilets and a small kitchen, the music department has a large main room and several smaller rooms.

References

External links 
 School website

Secondary schools in Cumbria
Educational institutions established in 1929
Catholic secondary schools in the Diocese of Lancaster
1929 establishments in England
Academies in Cumbria
Workington